Putnam Station is a hamlet in the town of Putnam in Washington County, New York, United States. Putnam Station has a post office with ZIP code 12861, which opened on July 30, 1879.

References

Hamlets in Washington County, New York
Hamlets in New York (state)